Cenegermin, sold under the brand name Oxervate, also known as recombinant human nerve growth factor (rhNGF), is a recombinant form of human nerve growth factor (NGF). In July 2017, it was approved in the European Union as an eye drop formulation for the treatment of moderate or severe neurotrophic keratitis in adults.

As a recombinant form of NGF, cenegermin is a peripherally selective agonist of the TrkA and LNGFR (p75NTR) which must be administered parenterally.

The U.S. Food and Drug Administration (FDA) considers it to be a first-in-class medication.

History 
It was developed by Anabasis Pharma, Dompé Farmaceutici, and Ospedale San Raffaele.

Research 
In addition to neurotrophic keratitis, cenegermin is also under development for the treatment of dry eyes, retinitis pigmentosa, and glaucoma.

References

Further reading

External links 
 

Neurotrophic factors
 Recombinant proteins
 Ophthalmology drugs